Tarlatepe can refer to:

 Tarlatepe, Kastamonu
 Tarlatepe, Sivrice